Billy Durkin (29 September 1921 – August 2000) was an English professional footballer who played as an inside forward.

Career
Born in Bradford, Durkin played for Bradford City, Rotherham United, Aldershot and Weymouth.

He died in Dorset in August 2000.

References

1921 births
2000 deaths
English footballers
Bradford City A.F.C. players
Rotherham United F.C. players
Aldershot F.C. players
Weymouth F.C. players
English Football League players
Association football forwards